Xantonnea is a genus of flowering plants in the family Rubiaceae. The genus has only two species that are found in Cambodja, Laos, Thailand, and Vietnam.

Species
Xantonnea parvifolia 
Xantonnea quocensis

References

Rubiaceae genera
Coffeeae